Crumpacker is a surname. Notable people with the surname include:

Edgar D. Crumpacker (1851–1920), U.S. Representative from Indiana
John Webber Crumpacker (1908–1996), U.S. Naval officer
Maurice E. Crumpacker (1886–1927), Republican U.S. congressman from Oregon
Shepard J. Crumpacker Jr. (1917–1986), U.S. Representative from Indiana

See also
Maurice Crumpacker House, the former residence of Maurice E. Crumpacker